Catlins Conservation Park is a protected area in the Otago region of New Zealand, covering 53,041 hectares in The Catlins, within the Clutha District.

The park includes the McLean Falls, and a range of tramping tracks.

History

The park was established in 1975.

It was included in the 1080 pest control programme in 2014.

The body of missing Dunedin man Stephen Lowe was found in the park in September 2017 by a librarian and her dog.

In January 2019, local MP Sarah Dowie proposed converting the park into a national park.

See also
 Conservation parks of New Zealand

References

Protected areas of Otago
The Catlins
Clutha District
Parks in Otago
1975 establishments in New Zealand
Protected areas established in 1975